The Austin Rover World Rally Team was a rally team created by Austin Rover that competed in the World Rally Championship from 1985 to 1986.

At its launch in 1985, Rover announced that it would complete the necessary number of cars required for homologation by November of that year. This was undertaken at the group's large manufacturing facility at Longbridge. The car was to participate in the Lombard RAC rally in November 1985, and an example, driven by works driver Tony Pond, finished a highly respectable third, behind two Lancia Delta S4s.

This good start was unfortunately not repeated, and although a 6R4 was entered in rallies at Monte Carlo, Sweden, Portugal and Corsica during the 1986 season, none of the Metros managed to complete a course. The majority of these problems were related to the V6 powerplant which suffered teething issues. Halfway during the 1986 season, Group B was banned (following a series of fatal crashes in which both competitors and spectators lost their lives). From that point on, the 6R4 was always going to be limited in front line competition, although they were run with limited success for the remainder of the year. A number passed into private hands and have proved formidable rally and rallycross cars. Despite the expiry of the 6R4's homologation the MSA still allow the cars to run in competition although engine sizes have been limited to 2800cc (single plenum engines) and 2500cc (multi-plenum engines).

Austin Rover withdrew from the rallying scene at the end of the season, but in 1987 all the parts and engines were sold to Tom Walkinshaw Racing, whereupon the V6 engine reappeared in the Jaguar XJ220, this time with turbochargers added.

WRC Results (Group B era)

1986 Rallye San Remo points and results were not counted towards World Rally Championship.

External links
World Rally Archive: MG's seasons

British Leyland
World Rally Championship teams